Alto Santo is a municipality in the state of Ceará in the Northeast region of Brazil.

The municipality contains the Castanhão Dam, the largest in the state, and the controversial Arena Coliseu Mateus Aquino.

See also
List of municipalities in Ceará

References

Municipalities in Ceará